Kšinná is a village and municipality in Bánovce nad Bebravou District in the Trenčín Region of north-western Slovakia.

History
In historical records the village was first mentioned in 1352.

Geography
The municipality lies at an altitude of 350 metres and covers an area of 41.249 km2. It has a population of about 540 people.

References

External links

 Official page
https://web.archive.org/web/20070513023228/http://www.statistics.sk/mosmis/eng/run.html

Villages and municipalities in Bánovce nad Bebravou District